Beaumont Middle College High School (BMCHS) is a public high school on the grounds of San Gorgonio Pass Campus of Mount San Jacinto College, in Banning, California. It is a part of the Beaumont Unified School District.

A joint project of the school district and the community college district, the school functions as an early college school. The school and community college districts enacted their agreement to create this school in January 2022, and the school itself opened in August of that year.

References

External links

Banning, California
Educational institutions established in 2022
2022 establishments in California